The following lists events and other items of interest occurring in 2015 in Iceland.

Incumbents
President – Ólafur Ragnar Grímsson 
Prime Minister – Sigmundur Davíð Gunnlaugsson

Deaths
22 April – Páll Skúlason, 69, philosopher
18 May – Halldór Ásgrímsson, 67, Prime Minister of Iceland (2004–2006) (heart attack)
2 August – Guðmunda Elíasdóttir, 95, film actress and opera singer

References

 
2010s in Iceland
Iceland
Iceland
Years of the 21st century in Iceland